Armenian-Azerbaijani cultural relations are relations between two ethnic groups in terms of their language and culture.

History 
In Soviet times, russification of Baku resulted in creation of Baku city sub-culture uniting the population of Baku, composed of Azeri, Russian, Armenian and other ethnic groups.

Language

Knowledge of Azeri language 
One of the sources for 1836 says that Azerbaijani "is in great use not only between Muslims, but even between Armenians and Jews."

Azerbaijani language was spoken among Tat-speaking Armenian communities. The Armenian population of Kohna Khachmaz and Garajally was Azeri-speaking. Armeno-Tats of Kilvar were often bilingual in Tat and Azeri and historically used the latter to communicate with Armenian-speaking Armenians as late as in 1912. The Iranian scholar B.V. Miller noted that back in 1912 an Armenian priest who did not know the Tat language was forced to preach sermons in Azerbaijani as it was more understandable for the “Armenian-Tat” population of the village Kilvar.

Azeri loanwords in Armenian language 

According to Armenian linguist Hrachia Acharian, the connection between Armenian and Azerbaijan languages started in the XI-XII centuries. It is related to migration of Oghuz turks from the south and kipchags from the north. Sources from XII-XIV centuries, especially, the works of Kirakos Gandzaketsi, Frik, Sempad the Constable, Hovhannes Erznkatsi and Yovhannēs Tʻlkurancʻi include more than 200 Azerbaijani and Turkic words.

In the book "Relations of Peter the Great with the Armenian People", commenting on Armenian documents, G.A. Ezov noted that the documents were "written, for the most part, in the spoken Armenian language, overflowing with Tatar (Azerbaijani) words", and they can be used as materials for the study of dialects of Armenian language.

In his 1902 book "The Turkish Loan Words in Armenian", the Armenian linguist and etymologist Hrachia Acharian listed loanwords from the Constantinople, Van, Nor Nakhichevan and Karabakh dialects, which were borrowed from the Turkish and Azerbaijani languages.

According to the linguist and turkologist E.V. Sevortyan, some loanwords of Azeri origin are found in the works of Hovhannes Erznkatsi. As examples of these, Sevortyan includes "verurem" and "aldurmush, which are found in one of the couplets of the poem “The son of a priest or the daughter of a mullah”. Sevortyan also mentions "yeri, yeri" in Azeri, and, possibly, "ayıb".

Azerbaijani loanwords are also seen in some Armenian songs of the ashug Sayat-Nova, the meaning of which was explained in I. Mirzoyan's article.

The loanwords such as karyandi and karyanti ("kosa"), found in the Karabakh and Kirzan dialects of Armenian languages, respectively, are back loans from the Azerbaijani language.

Literature

Folk and ashug poetry 

Hayren, an Armenian genre of poetry is the same with reading Bayati according to Armenian scientist M.Abeghyan. Vesfi-hal, Azeri genre of bayati related to fortune-telling has similarities with Armenian "can-gulum" in relation to how rituals performed and the volume of poems. Khachatur Abovian, Perch Proshian and Ghazaros Aghayan said that they used vesfi-hald and other forms of ashug poetry performed in Armenian and Azerbaijani folk ceremonies.

Ekber Yerevanli collected Armenian and Azerbaijani fairy tales. He found many similarities between Azerbaijani and Shakamakhi Armenian fairy tales. Armenians had their own versions for Azerbaijani epics such Kerem and Aslı, Ashiq Qarib and Epic of Koroghlu. Armenian David of Sassoun had a lot of common features with Azerbaiani version of Koroghlu.

Many Armenian ashugs wrote both in Armenian and Azerbaijani languages. But some preferred to write only in Azerbaijani. Famous examples include Horomsime Akuletsi, Miran, Seyyad, Miskin Burcu, Hpvakim Markaryan and Shirin. The ustadnameh that Slave Artun was so good that it was included to Azerbaijani epics. According to Hummet Alizade, the first ustadnameh of epic "Novruz" and the second ustadnameh of epic "Tahir and Zohre" belonged to him. Dellek Murad, the Armenian ashug of XVII century wrote qoshma, ustadnameh and qifilbends in Azerbaijani. He was considered ustad (master). Another Armenian ashug Naghash Hovnatan wrote "Mayilem"  which was popular among Azeris.

Sayat-Nova wrote 115 poems in Azeri. In addition, there is a poem where quatrains in Azerbaijani are intertwined with quatrains in Armenian, Persian and Georgian. Early 1758 seems to have been a time of feverish activity on the part of Sayat-Nova in the Azeri field. İt is possible that Sayat-Nova performed his songs in this language in public, in and outside Tiflis and Telaviş He continued Transcaucasian ashugs' tradition of writing in Azeri which was well understood by Eastern Armenians. He loved Nasimi just like Armenian ashug Miran did. He devoted 5 poems to Safavid ruler and Azerbaijani poet Ismail I.

Modern literature 

In 1956, the Azerbaijani poet Mammed Rahim wrote the poem “Sayat-Nova”, in which he reimagined the last days of Sayat-Nova and his tragic death.

Music 
Azeri music is played among the Armenians, who have adopted the system of mugham and the instruments kamancheh and tar. Azerbaijani tar which was designed by Sadigjan was very popular in Armenia. Moreover, in the 1890s Sadigjan founded a musical ensemble which included prominent folk singers and musicians performing Azeri, Armenian and Georgian folk songs. Two girls participating in ensemble performed Armenian, Azerbaijani and Georgian dances.

According to the 19th century historian Nikolai Dubrovin, Azerbaijani songs were also sung at Armenian weddings. Azerbaijani mugham singer Sattar skillfully performed Armenian and Georgian songs. In a little-known note (Poems. SPb., 1855, p. VII, note) about Sattar, Polonsky says:

The duduk, a folk instrument of Armenian origins is also present in Azerbaijani music.

The two nations also share the zurna, even the same melodies and rhytyms such as well known Sari Aghjik/Sari Gelin, Mejlumi pes/Yar bizə qonaq gələcək, Aman Tello, Alvan varder/Süsən Sünbül and Zov Gisher/Gözəlim Sənsən. Armenian Rabiz music shares similar features with music cultures of Georgia, Azerbaijan or Chechenia in terms of its style and audience.  This genre includes the use of Middle Eastern klklot/zengule.

Dance 

The place of origin for Uzundara dance is Nagorno-Karabakh (also known as Artsakh). In the collection "Azerbaijani folk dances" it is suggested that the Uzundara dance spread among the Karabakh Armenians as a result of living in close proximity to the Azerbaijanis. In turn, the Azerbaijani researcher K. Hasanov noted that “the Armenians also claim the authorship of this dance”.

Ceyrani dance is Azerbaijani and Armenian solo dance. The Armenian version of the dance is widespread in Karabakh and Zangezur.

Mirzayi is an Armenian and Azerbaijani female dance. Traditionally, it is performed in weddings. It can be performed both by women and men. Different Armenian varieties of the dance recorded in Shirak region are also known as Old Mirzayi and Tarakyama-Mirzayi.

Shalakho, Halay and Kochari dances are performed by many nations including Armenians and Azeris. The Armenian Kochari has been included to the List of Intangible Cultural Heritage in Need of Urgent Safeguarding of UNESCO in 2017. Azerbaijani Kochari along with tenzere has been included to the list of Intangible Cultural Heritage in Need of Urgent Safeguarding of UNESCO in November 2018 as versions of Yalli dance. Azerbaijani dance Yally was influenced by Armenian and Kurdish dances.

Visual arts 
Turkish Islamic art specialist Birgul Achykyldiz claims that the gravestones in the form of rams found in Armenian cemeteries (for example, in Julfa) with Armenian inscriptions and typical Armenian ornaments arose under the influence of the surrounding cultures - Kurdish and Azerbaijani traditions, well known in the region. According to Achykyildiz, zoomorphic gravestones are not typical for Armenian cemeteries, which are most commonly associated with rectangular khachkars. There is also an opinion about the similarity of statues of horses popular in Azerbaijani, Kurdish and Armenian cemeteries with the Oguz custom of putting a stuffed horse over the grave.

According to the Soviet ethnographer S.A.Tokarev, Azerbaijani rugs resemble Armenian ones in many ways. The weavers of Kazakh rugs are probably mostly Azeris, but it is clear that both Armenians and Georgians participated in the production of these rugs. Armenian,  Azerbaijani and Dagestani carpets are often grouped as one — Caucasian.

Theatre 

Arshin Mal Alan operetta was translated into many languages including Armenian. Soon after the Baku premiere, the musical comedy is shown throughout the Transcaucasia and Central Asia. In 1916, it was staged in Baku in Armenian. The work was staged in the Armenian language in Tbilisi (1914). Sidrak Magalyan was the translator and musical designer of the production. Later Magalyan played Asker (main character of the comedy) also in Georgian, Azerbaijani and Russian. Armenian composer Aro Stepanyan wrote:

From 1917 to 1922, the Armenian Women's Charitable Society in Tehran regularly organized performances of the operetta "Arshin Mal Alan". They performed it at the Shah's harem, where actresses, specially disguised to play male roles, were carefully checked by eunuchs in order to establish their gender.

From 1923 to 1958, the operetta was staged in almost all of the United States by the cast of the Armenian troupe. It was played on the stages of New York, Philadelphia, Detroit, Chicago, Cleveland, Boston, Racein, Los Angeles, Fresno, San Francisco.

Koroghlu was staged in Yerevan in 1942.

Cinema 
In 1937,  Setrag Vartian, the American director of Armenian descent filmed Arshin Mal Alan in Armenian without specifying the author. In 1960, director Nader Hafezi filmed an operetta in Iran. The main role in the film was played by Vigen Derderian? the Iranian pop singer of Armenian origin Vigen Derderian.

1988 Ashik Kerib film by Dodo Abashidze and Sergei Parajanov was based on an Azerbaijani legend record by Mikhail Lermontov. The music of film  was composed by Javanshir Guliyev and performed by Alim Gasimov. Film uses both mugham and ashig music of Azerbaijan. It includes the poetry of Ashig Alasgar, Aşıq Pəri and Aliagha Vahid. Sergei Parajanov also used Azeri poem of Sayat Nova in Arabic script in his The Color of Pomegranates movie.

Religion 
Baba-Hadji Mausoleum is Islamic Mausoleum and shared Armenian-Azerbaijani pilgrimage site. Prior to the Nagorno-Karabakh conflict, a mullah occasionally came over from Azerbaijan to lead prayers. Additionally, an Azerbaijani lived permanently near the shrine and collected donations for its upkeep.

Architecture 

Many Islamic Mausoleums, Mosques, and other monuments in the Karabakh region of Azerbaijan that were built after the 14th century show Armenian influences in their architecture. The Khachin-Darbatli Mausoleum was built in the 14th century in the Agdam district of Azerbaijan in the historical Karabakh region. Many art and architecture historians such as Samvel Karapetyan, Patrick Donabédian, Leonid Bretanitski and Boris Vejmarn note the distinct similarities between this mausoleum and the Armenian Yeghvard Church built thirteen years earlier. According to Donabédian, the two structures exhibit mutual influences of Christian and Islamic art. Architectural researcher Raffi Kortoshian asserts that Inscriptions on both the structures demonstrate that they were built by the same Armenian architect, Vardapet Shahik. The name of the Khachin-Darbatli Mausoleum also reveals the Armenian influences. According to Azerbaijani researcher Cavid Aga, the first part of the name incorporates the name of the medieval Armenian Principality of Khachen. Azerbaijani scholar Elchin Aliyev acknowledges the Armenian influences in these mausoleums and cites them as important tools in repairing the cultural relations of the two nations.

See also 
Armeno-Kipchak language

References 

Armenia–Azerbaijan relations
Armenian culture
Azerbaijani culture